Pei Chin Bibiana (born 16 June 1977, in Langkawi, Malaysia) is a Malaysian sport shooter. Pei has been a practicing shooter since 1994 and began competing in the same year. She competed at the 2010 Commonwealth Games in Delhi, Winning a gold medal in the 10m air pistol individual event.

References

1977 births
Living people
Commonwealth Games gold medallists for Malaysia
Malaysian female sport shooters
Shooters at the 2006 Asian Games
Shooters at the 2010 Asian Games
Commonwealth Games medallists in shooting
Southeast Asian Games gold medalists for Malaysia
Southeast Asian Games silver medalists for Malaysia
Southeast Asian Games medalists in shooting
Shooters at the 2018 Asian Games
Shooters at the 2010 Commonwealth Games
Competitors at the 2009 Southeast Asian Games
Competitors at the 2019 Southeast Asian Games
Asian Games competitors for Malaysia
20th-century Malaysian women
Medallists at the 2010 Commonwealth Games